Ashley Callingbull (born October 21, 1989) is a Canadian model, actress, and television personality. She became the first Canadian and Indigenous woman to win the Mrs. Universe title on 29 August 2015.

She and her stepfather participated in the 4th season of The Amazing Race Canada. They also ran in the 2nd Amazing Race Devon, a local youth fundraiser, in which they placed 2nd.

Life and career
Callingbull was born in Enoch Cree Nation near Edmonton in Alberta, to Cree parents. By the age of 10, she had consecutively won all Enoch's princess crowns in her community. She graduated from high school at the age of 16. Soon after, she began her University studies to pursue her Bachelor of Science, Communications, and an Arts degree focusing on drama and acting/television.

Callingbull was also chosen as Miss Canada for the Miss Friendship International Pageant held in Hubei, China in September 2010, and represented Canada at the Queen of the World Final held in Germany also in 2010.

She also represented Canada at Miss Humanity International in Barbados in October 2011.

She used her fame to urge the First Nations band governments to vote to depose the Conservative Party of Canada in the 2015 federal election.  Callingbull stated that the First Nation's concerns needed to be prominent in the campaign. While competing in Mrs. Universe, she wore a dress that aimed to raise awareness for missing and murdered Indigenous women, designed by Lesley Hampton.

In May 2022, she become the first Indigenous woman to be featured in a Sports Illustrated Swimsuit Issue.

She is also an actress and plays Sheila Delaronde in the series ''Blackstone.

Personal life
Callingbull has said that she "never had the perfect childhood everyone dreams of. I had an incredibly difficult childhood and was raised mainly by my mother and grandparents...It was difficult to grow up the way I did, but it made me appreciate everything I have and most importantly made me the strong woman I am today."

In February 2015, Callingbull married Ryan Burnham in the Bahamas. The couple divorced sometime later.

Callingbull says she was drawn to the Mrs. Universe competition because of its domestic violence theme.
"I thought, this is a perfect platform for me because I'm relatable to people, I've experienced this myself and I'm able to speak about it," she said. "I'm glad I'm able to use this title as a way to speak for others that can't speak for themselves."

She also credits turning to her First Nation culture for helping her heal and find herself.

In June 2021, Callingbull got engaged to hockey player Wacey Rabbit. The couple married in September that same year.

References

External links

 Living people
Cree people
 Female models from Alberta
 Canadian beauty pageant winners
 Actresses from Alberta
First Nations actresses
1989 births
The Amazing Race Canada contestants